Hart Plain is part of Waterlooville and is the northwesternmost ward in the Borough of Havant. The population of Hart Plain is 8,755 and makes up 7.3% of Havant borough's population.

The ward takes its name from the old Hart Plain House which formerly stood on the site now occupied by Waterlooville Health Centre. The ward consists mainly of post-1950s housing and includes Portsmouth City Council's Wecock Estate.

There is one school in the ward, Hart Plain Junior School, located next to the Cowplain School in Hart Plain Avenue.

References

Villages in Hampshire
Havant